Naila is a town in Bavaria, Germany.

Naila may also refer to:

Naila (name), an Arabic female given name.
Naila-Janjgir, a city and a municipality in Janjgir-Champa district, Chhattisgarh, India
Naila (film), a 1965 Pakistani musical romance drama film

See also
Neyla (disambiguation)
Nayla, a given name